The UGM-73 Poseidon missile was the second US Navy nuclear-armed submarine-launched ballistic missile (SLBM) system, powered by a two-stage solid-fuel rocket. It succeeded the UGM-27 Polaris beginning in 1972, bringing major advances in warheads and accuracy. It was followed by Trident I in 1979, and Trident II in 1990.

Development
A development study for a longer range version of the Polaris missile—achieved by enlarging it to the maximum possible size allowed by existing launch tubes—started in 1963. Tests had already shown that Polaris missiles could be operated without problems in launch tubes that had their fiberglass liners and locating rings removed.

The project was given the title Polaris B3 in November, but the missile was eventually named Poseidon C3 to emphasize the technical advances over its predecessor. The C3 was the only version of the missile produced, and it was also given the designation UGM-73A.

Slightly longer and considerably wider and heavier than Polaris A3, Poseidon had the same  range, greater payload capacity, improved accuracy, and multiple independently targetable reentry vehicle (MIRV) capability. MIRV capacity has been given as up to either ten or fourteen W68 thermonuclear warheads contained in Mark 3 reentry vehicles to multiple targets.

As with Polaris, starting a rocket motor when the missile was still in the submarine was considered very dangerous. Therefore, the missile was ejected from its launch tube using high pressure steam produced by a solid-fueled boiler.

The weapon officially entered service on 31 March 1971. It eventually equipped 31 -, -, and -class submarines.

The Royal Navy also considered adopting Poseidon in the 1970s as an upgrade to its Polaris A3T boats, and like the US this would have kept the existing hulls. Although the Navy's favoured option, the British government instead adopted Chevaline, a two warhead MRV system with decoys, on the existing Polaris airframes and later moved to the Trident D5 in new boats.

Beginning in 1979, 12 Poseidon-equipped SSBNs were refitted with Trident I. By 1992, the Soviet Union had collapsed, 12 Ohio-class submarines had been commissioned, and the START I treaty had gone into effect, so the 31 older Poseidon- and Trident I-armed SSBNs were disarmed, withdrawing Poseidon from service.

Operators
 
 United States Navy

Gallery

See also
 List of missiles

References

Cold War weapons of the United States
Nuclear weapons of the United States
Cold War submarine-launched ballistic missiles of the United States
Lockheed Corporation
UGM-073
Military equipment introduced in the 1970s